Master's Edge is an  gritstone arête that is a rock climbing route in the "Corners Area" of Millstone Edge quarry, in the Peak District, England. When English climber Ron Fawcett completed the first free ascent of the route on 29 December 1983, it was graded E7 6c, and one of the hardest traditional climbing routes in the world; it remains one of the hardest gritstone climbs.

History
Fawcett's rival, English climber Jerry Moffatt, had been top-roping the route earlier that year, waiting for the right conditions to lead it, and had said that: "anyone who could do this climb without abseiling down it first, or practicing it on a top rope, would be a true master".  

In his biography, Fawcett said that by late 1983, he was desperate to find a bold new route and that someone had mentioned that Moffatt had been working on a new climb just below Great Arete (E5 5c), at Millstone Edge, and had already called it Master's Edge (in January 1983, Moffatt had freed a major new route he called Master's Wall E7 6b at Clogwyn Du'r Arddu).  While only 28 at the time, Fawcett remarked that "I was starting to feel part of an older generation whose time was passing, Master's Edge might give me the chance to turn the clock back a little".  Fawcett, belayed by his wife Gill, completed the route in one day on 29 December 1983 after taking a few attempts, and one serious fall that was arrested by his new Amigo protection but without the aid of top-roping.  Fawcett said that Moffatt was pretty upset, but in the era before sport climbing in Britain (i.e. where climbers would take time to install bolts onto a route), "it was a free for all".

Described as "Fawcett's Masterpiece", the route remained a serious and intimidating undertaking for even the greatest climbers, and it wasn't until 2004 that English climber Liam Halsey completed the first flash of the route (although with some falls).  In the 1990s, German climber Wolfgang Gullich broke his back in a fall on the route when testing his protective gear. In 1994, 19-year old Airlie Anderson made the first female free ascent of the route, and became the first-ever female to climb an E7.  In 2009, American climber Alex Honnold, onsighted Master's Edge, and in an interview afterwards said that he found the route "hard", "sustained", and "scary".

While the route retains its "E7" grade due to the extreme level of risk, the technical difficulty has been lowered slightly from 6c to 6b; however, flashes are still rare enough to be worthy of capture in the climbing media, an example being English climber Nathan Lee's 2016 flash of what Rock & Ice described as the "ultra-classic", Master's Edge.

Filmography
 Major climbs in Peak District: 
 Shows Swedish climber Richard Ekehed on Master's Edge :

Notes

See also
History of rock climbing
Hubble, first grade  in the world, Raven Tor, Peak District, England
Hard Grit, a 1998 film on Peak District extreme gritstone routes
Indian Face, first grade E9 traditional climb in the world, Clogwyn Du'r Arddu, Wales

References

External links
The Millstone Area, Free chapter from British Mountaineering Council Peak District guidebook covering Millstone Edge quarry (2006)
The Master's Edge E7 6c, UKClimbing.com Database (January 2022)

Climbing routes
Climbing areas of England